The Marolambo National Park covers a forested region of Eastern Madagascar, between Marolambo (region: Atsinanana), Antanifotsy (region: Vakinankaratra), Fandriana (region: Amoron'i Mania), Nosy Varika (Vatovavy), Ifanadiana (Vatovavy) and Ambositra (Amoron'i Mania).

References

National parks of Madagascar
Atsinanana
Amoron'i Mania
Vakinankaratra
Vatovavy
Madagascar subhumid forests